Jimmy the Kid is a 1982 American comedy film starring Gary Coleman and Paul Le Mat.  It was directed by Gary Nelson, produced by Ronald Jacobs, and released on November 12, 1982 by New World Pictures.  Following 1981's On the Right Track, it was the second theatrical film release starring Coleman.

Cast
 Gary Coleman as Jimmy
 Paul Le Mat as John Dortmunder
 Ruth Gordon as Bernice
 Dee Wallace as May
 Cleavon Little as Herb
 Don Adams as Harry Walker
 Pat Morita as Maurice
 Fay Hauser as Nina
 Avery Schreiber as Dr. Stevens
 Walter Olkewicz as Kelp

Production
The film was based on the 1974 novel of the same name by Donald E. Westlake. It was the third book of Westlake's Dortmunder series. One of the shooting locations was Bob Hope's Malibu Canyon plantation.

Reception
Jimmy the Kid grossed $5 million at the box office.

Critical response
Overall, critical reception of the family-friendly comedy was on the negative side. Critic Gene Siskel, who called himself "one of few Americans who publicly declared his affection for On the Right Track" concluded that Coleman's follow-up was "definitely on the wrong track." Siskel's TV counterpart Roger Ebert also found little to like in the film, but admitted that kids may well enjoy it.

Stephen Hunter of The Baltimore Sun wrote in his review: "Jimmy the Kid proves a longstanding cinema law: Any movie calling itself a "comedy crime caper" is likely to be a misdemeanor against good taste."

Carter Colwell of The Daytona Beach News-Journal wrote in his review: "ONCE UPON a time, Donald E. Westlake wrote a bunch of funny mystery stories. And then one day, he wrote one that was not very funny, but it was still pretty funny. In it, a bunch of klutzy burglars decide to conduct a kidnapping, following a plan laid out in a book one of them has read. And then Donald E. Westlake sold his pretty funny kidnapping story to Hollywood. And they made a movie out of it. It was called Jimmy the Kid. It was not very funny. And it was not pretty funny either."

The Philadelphia Inquirer Staff of The Philadelphia Inquirer wrote in  their review: "Jimmy the Kid combines elements of Coco the Clown, Carnac the Magnificent, and the Pink Panther into Movie the Bad. Someone wisely kept this weak Gary Coleman comedy about an overly mature rich kid in the can since 1981."

Release
Jimmy the Kid was released in theatres on November 12, 1982. In the Lawrence Journal-World, a national newspaper advertisement used in November 1982 to advertise release of film. Jimmy the Kid was released on VHS.

References

Sources

External links
 
 

1982 films
Films directed by Gary Nelson
New World Pictures films
Films based on works by Donald E. Westlake
Films based on American novels
Films about kidnapping
American comedy films
Films scored by John Cameron
1980s English-language films
1980s American films